Portavadie is a village on the shores of Loch Fyne on the west coast of the Cowal peninsula in Argyll and Bute, Scottish Highlands.

The Portavadie complex was built by the then Scottish Office for the purpose of constructing concrete platforms for extraction of oil from the North Sea. However, the intention was soon overtaken by acceptance that steel platforms were the future for the oil industry in Scotland. Despite suggestions to turn the complex into a holiday village, it lay redundant until in the mid-1980s the enclosed port was used by a local fish farm company.

A further report in the Dunoon Observer and Argyllshire Standard, says that the derelict "village", known as Polphail, was sold to a forestry company who plan to demolish the buildings and build new houses. It remains in situ currently.

Portavadie Marina
In late 2009 the marina was used for the first time to tie up yachts for the Scottish series by the Clyde Cruising Club, won by Nigel Biggs; England; J109-IRC.

The new Portavadie Marina complex opened to the public in 2010. The first phase of the complex consisted of five-star luxury apartments, with private sauna facilities and four-star cottages, alongside a restaurant, conference suites and a retail space.

The second phase, The Lodge, arrived shortly after, consisting of hotel style accommodation, fully accessible studio apartments, staff accommodation and a second "family style" restaurant.

The third phase was officially launched in August 2016, with a luxury spa and leisure complex being added to the amenities.

Loch Lomond and Cowal Way
The Loch Lomond and Cowal Way starts and finishes at Portavadie; this long-distance waymarked footpath takes one to Inveruglas on the shore of Loch Lomond, in the Loch Lomond and The Trossachs National Park,  of walking later.

Portavadie Ferry Terminal
National 

There is a Caledonian MacBrayne ferry service across Loch Fyne to Tarbert on the Kintyre Peninsula.

References

External links

 Caledonian MacBrayne, Portavadie page - Website
 Portavadie Marina - website
 Loch Lomond and Cowal Way - Website
 Clyde Cruising Club - website

History of the petroleum industry in the United Kingdom
Marinas in Scotland
Ports and harbours of Scotland
Villages in Cowal